The 2023 Notre Dame Fighting Irish football team will represent the University of Notre Dame as an independent during the 2023 NCAA Division I FBS football season. The Fighting Irish are expected to be led by Marcus Freeman in his second year as Notre Dame's head coach. They play their home games at Notre Dame Stadium in South Bend, Indiana.

Offseason

Coaching Changes
The following coaches left the program:
 Tommy Rees left for the offensive coordinator position at Alabama.
 OL coach Harry Hiestand announced his retirement.
 ST coach Brian Mason left for the same position with the Indianapolis Colts of the NFL. 

The following coaches were hired: 
 Gino Guidugli was hired to be the quarterbacks coach. 
 Joe Rudolph was hired from Virginia Tech to be the offensive line coach.
 Marty Biagi was hired from Ole Miss to be the special teams coordinator.

Departures

Transfers Out
 DB Jayden Bellamy transferred to Syracuse.
 TE Cane Berrong transferred to Coastal Carolina.
 LB Osita Ekwonu transferred to Charlotte.
 DL Jacob Lacey transferred to Oklahoma.
 QB Drew Pyne transferred to Arizona State.
 WR Joe Wilkins, Jr. transferred to Miami.

NFL
 DE Justin Ademilola entered the draft.
 DE Isaiah Foskey entered the draft.
 S Brandon Joseph entered the draft.
 TE Michael Mayer entered the draft.

Additions

Transfers In
 K Spencer Schrader transferred in from USF.
 WR Kaleb Smith transferred in from Virginia Tech.
 QB Sam Hartman transferred in from Wake Forest.
 DB Thomas Harper transferred in from Oklahoma State.
 DE Javontae Jean-Baptiste transferred in from Ohio State.

Recruiting

On December 21, 2022, Notre Dame welcomed the addition of 24 student-athletes from the 2023 recruiting class.

Schedule

References

Notre Dame
Notre Dame Fighting Irish football seasons
Notre Dame Fighting Irish football